Flammulina populonica is an edible winter mushroom. It differs from closely related species Flammulina velutipes by being slightly larger in size and having a thicker stem. It grows on wood of quaking aspen and other poplars (members of the genus Populus).

It is found mainly in northern Europe and North America.

Culinarily, it is used in the same way as F. velutipes. It requires cooking and is often used  in soups.

References

Physalacriaceae